Bayou Gauche is a census-designated place and fishing village, with an adjacent natural bayou and wetlands. It is located in St. Charles Parish, Louisiana, United States. As of 2020, its population was 2,161.

Geography
Bayou Gauche is part of the Greater New Orleans region. It is located at  (29.825162, -90.434727).

Demographics

Economy
The fishing and shellfish industries have been important in the local economy. Some residences for people in those fields, and their families, are stilt houses in the bayou and wetlands.

Oil wells for petroleum production are also present.

Education
St. Charles Parish Public School System operates public schools:
R. J. Vial Elementary School (grades 3-5) in Paradis - Opened in 1975
J. B. Martin Middle School (grades 6-8) in Paradis

References

External links

Census-designated places in Louisiana
Census-designated places in St. Charles Parish, Louisiana
Census-designated places in New Orleans metropolitan area